Mandapeta Assembly constituency is a constituency in Konaseema district of Andhra Pradesh, representing the state legislative assembly in India. It is one of the seven assembly segments of Amalapuram Lok Sabha constituency, along with Ramachandrapuram, Mummidivaram, Amalapuram (SC), Razole, Gannavaram and Kothapeta. V.Jogeswara Rao is the present MLA of the constituency, who won the 2019 Andhra Pradesh Legislative Assembly election from Telugu Desam Party. , there are a total of 214,324 electors in the constituency.

Mandals 

The three mandals that form the assembly constituency are:

Members of Legislative Assembly

Election results

Assembly Elections 2009

Assembly elections 2014

Assembly Elections 2019

See also 
 List of constituencies of the Andhra Pradesh Legislative Assembly

References 

Assembly constituencies of Andhra Pradesh